Pico-ITXe is a PC Pico-ITX motherboard specification created by VIA Technologies and SFF-SIG. It was announced by VIA Technologies on October 29, 2008 and released in December 2008. The Pico-ITXe specifications call for the board to be , which is half the area of Nano-ITX, and 12 layers deep. The processor can be a VIA C7 that uses VIA's NanoBGA2 technology. It uses DDR2 667/533 SO-DIMM memory, with support for up to 2GB. Video is supplied by VIA's Chrome9 HC3 GPU with built-in MPEG-2, 4, WMV9, and VC1 decoding acceleration. The BIOS is a 4 or 8 Mbit Award BIOS.

EPIA-P710 
The first motherboard that was produced under this specification is called EPIA-P710. It was released in December 2008. The operating temperature range is from 0°C to about 50°C. The operating humidity level (relative and non-condensing) can be from 0% to about 95%. It uses a 1 GHz VIA C7-M processor, a VIA VX800 chip set, and is RoHS compliant. It has onboard VGA video-out. Gigabit Ethernet is supplied by VIA's VT6122, but requires a connector board. HD 5.1 channel audio is provided by a VIA VT1708B chip.

The following are the standard I/O connections:
2× SUMIT QMS/QFS series connectors by Samtec
1× GigaLAN pin header
1× Audio Pin Connector for Line-out, Line-in, MIC-in
1× Front Panel pin header
1× CRT pin header
1× UDMA 100/133 44-pin PATA
1× 3 Gbit/s SATA 
DVI and LVDS video-out
USB 2.0
COM
PS/2 Mouse & Keyboard

Up to four I/O expansion boards can be stacked upon each other using the SUMIT interface.

See also 
 Pico-ITX
 Mini-ITX
 Mobile-ITX
 EPIA
 Ultra-Mobile PC

References

External links 
Pico-ITXe Specification Home
EPIA-P710 Product Home Page
Hothardware Article

Motherboard
Motherboard form factors